The Puerto Rico Zoological Society was founded by Dr. Juan A. Rivero, a professor of Biology of the University of Puerto Rico at Mayagüez. Dr. Rivero went on to serve as the Society's first president.

The Zoological Society contributed to the development of Puerto Rico's only zoo, located at the UPR Mayagüez campus, named by the Legislature in 1998 as the "Dr. Juan A. Rivero Zoo".

References 

https://web.archive.org/web/20160303182630/http://www.uprm.edu/biology/profs/rivero/cv.htm

Zoological societies
Scientific societies based in Puerto Rico